Şemsa Özar (Þemsa Özar) is a professor in the Department of Economics at Boğaziçi University, Turkey and past president of the International Association for Feminist Economics (IAFFE), her tenure was 2015 to 2016.

Education 
Özar gained her degree and masters from Boğaziçi University in Turkey in 1977 and 1978 respectively. Her post-graduate degree came from the Institute for Advanced Studies and Scientific Research, Vienna in 1988 and her PhD came from the Wirtschaftsuniversität Wien (Vienna University of Economics and Business) Austria in 1990. Her PhD thesis title was: The Effects of the IMF-Supported Programs on Income Distribution: Turkey as a Case.

Fellowships 
 2002 International Policy Fellow, Open Society Institute

See also 
 Feminist economics
 List of feminist economists

References

External links 
 Profile page: Semsa Ozar Boğaziçi University, Turkey
 Profile page: Semsa Ozar International Policy Fellow, Open Society Institute

Boğaziçi University alumni
Academic staff of Boğaziçi University
Date of birth missing (living people)
Development economists
Feminist economists
Living people
Place of birth missing (living people)
Turkish economists
Vienna University of Economics and Business alumni
Year of birth missing (living people)
Presidents of the International Association for Feminist Economics